The discography of American country music singer-songwriter K. T. Oslin contains six studio albums, six compilation albums, one video album, seven music videos, 25 singles and six album appearances. Oslin signed a recording contract with Elektra Records in 1981. Both singles failed to become major hits. She then signed with RCA Records in 1987 and released the single "80's Ladies." The song became a top ten country hit, reaching number seven on the Billboard Hot Country Songs chart in July 1987. Oslin's corresponding debut studio album of the same name reached number one on the Billboard Top Country Albums chart and spent 148 weeks on the list. It would also be her highest-charting album on the Billboard 200, peaking at number 68. The album would sell one million copies and spawn the number one hits "Do Ya" and "I'll Always Come Back." Oslin's second album, This Woman was released in 1988 and was her second record to certify platinum in sales. It was her second-highest charting album on the country chart, reaching number two in 1989. Its second single, "Hold Me," topped the country songs chart in January 1989. The album also spawned the top ten hits "Hey Bobby" and the title track.

In 1990, Love in a Small Town became Oslin's third studio release. It reached number five on the country albums list and spent 71 weeks charting. It spawned Oslin's third number one hit, "Come Next Monday." Her career slowed down following the album, yet she did release 1993's Greatest Hits: Songs from an Aging Sex Bomb. In 1996, she returned with a new studio record titled "My Roots Are Showing...". It reached a lower-end position on the Top Country Albums chart, peaking at number 45 after six weeks. The album spawned two singles, including the charting single "Silver Tongue and Goldplated Lies." In 2001, Live Close By, Visit Often became her fifth studio recording. Its cover of "Come on-a My House," was her first (and only) single to chart on the Billboard Hot Dance Club Songs list. In 2015, Oslin released her final studio effort, Simply. In December 2020, Oslin died after several years battling Parkinson's disease.

Albums

Studio albums

Compilation albums

Singles

Videography

Video albums

Music videos

Other album appearances

Notes

References

External links
 
 Entry at 45cat.com as K. T.
 Entry at 45cat.com as Kay T.

Oslin, K. T.
Discographies of American artists